The Union for Woolwich Staff was a trade union representing workers at the Woolwich Building Society in the United Kingdom.

The union was founded in 1979 as the Woolwich Independent Staff Association.  In 1999, it became known as the "Union of Woolwich Staff", and affiliated to the Trades Union Congress.  In 2002, it merged into the UNIFI trade union, mirroring the purchase of the Woolwich by Barclays Bank.

References

Trade unions established in 1979
Finance sector trade unions
Defunct trade unions of the United Kingdom
2002 disestablishments in the United Kingdom
Trade unions disestablished in 2002
Trade unions based in Kent